San Francisco Bay National Wildlife Refuge Complex is a National Wildlife Refuge complex in the state of California, comprising seven separate wildlife refuges in and around San Francisco Bay. They are administered by the U.S. Fish and Wildlife Service. The complex is also responsible for the Common Murre Restoration Project, designed to protect seabird life on the California central cost, including the Common Murre. The project hopes to establish a colony of murres at Devil's Slide Rock near Pacifica.

Refuges within the complex
Antioch Dunes National Wildlife Refuge
Don Edwards San Francisco Bay National Wildlife Refuge
Ellicott Slough National Wildlife Refuge
Farallon National Wildlife Refuge
Marin Islands National Wildlife Refuge
Salinas River National Wildlife Refuge
San Pablo Bay National Wildlife Refuge

References

Complex website

External links
 

National Wildlife Refuges in California
Wetlands of California
Protected areas of the San Francisco Bay Area